The Directorate of Air Intelligence is the intelligence arm of the Indian Air Force. It provides timely, accurate and synchronized intelligence support for tactical, operational needs of the Air force.

History
DAI was set up in 1942 as part of the erstwhile Royal Indian Air Force to provide aerial reconnaissance for both the RIAF and RAF, during WW2. It saw major action in Burma campaign

After Independence, DAI provided intelligence support to the IAF during every major war India fought.

Air Force intelligence responsibilities included imagery intelligence collection through MiG-25R and Jaguar reconnaissance aircraft. 

During the 1971 India-Pakistan War, Russian satellite imagery provided India with information on Chinese force deployments. With advances in the Indian space program, the Indian Air Force will be acquiring independent space-based imagery intelligence capabilities.

During Kargil war, DAI played an important role in providing aerial intelligence about occupied posts and bunkers. These targets were later thoroughly bombed by IAF as a part of Operation Safed Sagar.

References 

Air intelligence
Defence agencies of India
Indian intelligence agencies
1941 establishments in British India
Government agencies established in 1941